William Maddox may refer to:
 William J. Maddox Jr (1921–2001), United States Army general
 William A. T. Maddox (1814–1889), officer in the United States Marine Corps